In mathematics, the Fulton–Hansen connectedness theorem is a result from intersection theory in algebraic geometry, for the case of subvarieties of projective space with codimension large enough to make the intersection have components of dimension at least 1.  It is named after William Fulton and Johan Hansen, who proved it in 1979.

The formal statement is that if V and W are irreducible algebraic subvarieties of a projective space P, all over an algebraically closed field, and if

 

in terms of the dimension of an algebraic variety, then the intersection U of V and W is connected.

The special case of intersections is recovered by taking , with  the natural inclusion.

See also
 Zariski's connectedness theorem
 Grothendieck's connectedness theorem
 Deligne's connectedness theorem

References

External links
 PDF lectures with the result as Theorem 15.3 (attributed to Faltings, also)

Intersection theory
Theorems in algebraic geometry